Apoyaco is a village and municipality in Catamarca Province in northwestern Argentina bordering Chle. The indigenous Atacama people live in this province and village. The village and region is home to lamini, alpaca and llama herding as well as farming pumpkins, zucchini, chili, beans, tobacco, melon, corn, potatoes, and quinoa.

See also
Atacama people
Catamarca Province
Argentina

References

Populated places in Catamarca Province